Matar may refer to:

People

Given name
 Matar Coly (born 1984), Senegalese footballer
 Matar Fall (born 1982), French-born Senegalese football 
 Matar Sène (born 1970), retired Senegalese freestyle wrestler

Surname
 Agapius II Matar (1736–1812), Patriarch of the Melkite Greek Catholic Church from 1796 to 1812
 Ahmad Abu Matar (born 1944), Palestinian academic and writer 
 Ahmed Matar (born 1954), Iraqi poet 
 Athanasius V Matar, Patriarch of the Melkite Greek Catholic Church in 1813
 Ghiath Matar (died 2011), Syrian activist
 Hadi Matar (born 1998), suspect of the stabbing of Salman Rushdie 
 Hisham Matar (born 1970), American and Libyan author
 Ismail Matar (born 1983), footballer from the United Arab Emirates
 Joseph Matar (born 1935), Lebanese painter and poet
 Maryam Matar (born 1975), Emirati geneticist and medical researcher
 Matar Matar (born 1976), Bahraini politician of the Al Wefaq party
 Muhammad Afifi Matar (1935–2010), Egyptian poet
 Nader Matar (born 1992), Lebanese footballer 
 Nadia Matar (born 1966), Belgian-born Israeli activist
 Paul Youssef Matar (born 1941), current Archeparch of the Maronite Catholic Archeparchy of Beirut
 Salim Matar, Iraqi nationalist and novelist
 Selim Matar (born 1956), Swiss writer, novelist and sociologist of Iraqi descent
 Yasser Matar (born 1985), Emirati footballer.

Other uses
 Matar, another name for the star Eta Pegasi
 USS Matar, Crater-class cargo ship commissioned by the U.S. Navy for service in World War II
 Matar, Kheda, a village in Gujarat, India

See also
 Mattar, a surname